József Windecker (born 2 December 1992 in Szeged, Hungary) is a Hungarian football player, currently playing for Paksi FC.

Club statistics

Updated to games played as of 15 May 2021.

External links
Profile

1992 births
Living people
Sportspeople from Szeged
Hungarian people of German descent
Hungarian footballers
Association football midfielders
Győri ETO FC players
BFC Siófok players
Paksi FC players
Újpest FC players
Levadiakos F.C. players
Nemzeti Bajnokság I players
Super League Greece players
Hungarian expatriates in Greece
Expatriate footballers in Greece